Amacueca   is a town and municipality, in Jalisco in central-western Mexico. The municipality covers an area of  131.79 km2.

As of 2005, the municipality had a total population of 5,065.

Government

Municipal presidents

References

Municipalities of Jalisco